State Highway 165 (SH-165) is a state highway in Muskogee County, Oklahoma. It runs east along Peak Boulevard in the southern part of Muskogee from US-64 to the northern terminus of the southern section of the Muskogee Turnpike, then runs north as a freeway connecting the two sections of the turnpike.

The freeway connecting the two halves of the Muskogee Turnpike was first numbered as SH-165 in 1969. The east–west portion of highway along Peak Boulevard was built and numbered as SH-165 by 1987.

Route description
SH-165 begins at an interchange on Peak Boulevard on the south side of Muskogee. To the west of this interchange, Peak Boulevard carries US-64; that highway exits from Peak at the interchange and proceeds south towards Warner. This interchange is also the eastern terminus of US-64 Business, which continues to the north towards downtown Muskogee. From the interchange, SH-165 follows Peak Boulevard to the east as an expressway, crossing Coody Creek before turning to the east-northeast. As the highway crosses York Street, it exits the Muskogee city limits.

SH-165 then has an partial interchange with the Muskogee Turnpike; the turnpike is only accessible from southbound SH-165. The Muskogee Turnpike consists of two disconnected sections of toll road with an untolled freeway segment in between; northbound SH-165 traffic merges with the northbound lanes of the turnpike to form this freeway. Shortly after this interchange, the highway re-enters Muskogee. The SH-165 freeway serves the east side of Muskogee, with interchanges with city arterials such as Chandler Road, Hancock Street, and Gibson Street. The highway also includes a full cloverleaf interchange with US-62. At this interchange, SH-165 ends; northbound traffic defaults onto the northbound Muskogee Turnpike towards Tulsa.

History
The freeway between the two sections of the Muskogee Turnpike that would later become SH-165 first appears on the official Oklahoma state map in 1969. The Muskogee inset of that map shows the freeway, unnumbered, and the southern SH-165–turnpike interchange in place, but with ramp stubs, as the SH-165 portion of Peak Boulevard had yet to be built. The following year's map shows SH-165 in place along the connector freeway. By 1975, the Peak Boulevard portion of SH-165 was under construction. The highway was complete and in its present-day configuration by 1987.

Junction list

References

External links
SH-165 at OKHighways.com

165
Transportation in Muskogee County, Oklahoma